Virginia Centurione Bracelli School (abbrv. VCBS) is a private, Roman Catholic school located in Poctoy, Odiongan, Romblon. It is part of the worldwide network of Figlie di Nostra Signora al Monte Calvario (Daughters of Our Lady on Mount Calvary). The school is a combined preparatory, elementary and high school institution.

Administration
The school is headed by the directress who can sometimes be the person of local superior of the congregation in the area and, thus, only nun can be the directress. The school principal follows the directress in precedence. The principal, however, can be a man or a woman. The school is, partly, run by the congregation of the Daughters of Our Lady on Mount Calvary.

Curriculum change 

In 2011, the Department of Education started to implement the new K-12 educational system, which also included a new curriculum for all schools nationwide. The K-12 program has a so-called "phased implementation", which started in S.Y 2011-2012.

Student media
The school periodically runs its own publication called The Bracellian Eye.

Buildings
The school is composed of 4 main buildings on a quadrangle and a guardhouse.

References

External links
Daughters of Our Lady on Mount Calvary, Official Website

Schools in Romblon
Catholic elementary schools in the Philippines
Catholic secondary schools in the Philippines